Pride is a champion French racemare who won three Group 1 races. Her biggest success was the 2006 Hong Kong Cup. She was also an unlucky second in the Prix de l'Arc de Triomphe. Her other feature wins were the Champion Stakes and Grand Prix de Saint-Cloud. Her rating of 123 on the 2006 World Thoroughbred Racehorse Rankings made her the highest ranked mare in the world.

Background
She is by Peintre Celebre out of Specificity She was first sent into training with John E. Hammond at Chantilly.

References

2000 racehorse births
Racehorses bred in France
Racehorses trained in France
Thoroughbred family 8-d